The Archbishopric of Vienne, named after its episcopal seat in Vienne in the Isère département of southern France, was a metropolitan Roman Catholic archdiocese. It is now part of the Archdiocese of Lyon.

History

The legend according to which Crescens, the first Bishop of Vienne, is identical with the Crescens of Saint Paul's Second Letter to Timothy, iv, 20 certainly postdates the letter of Pope Zosimus to the Church of Arles (417) and the letter of the bishops of Gaul in 451; because, although both these documents allude to the claims to glory which Arles owes to St. Trophimus, neither of them mentions Crescens. Archbishop Ado of Vienne (860–875) set afoot this legend of the Apostolic origin of the See of Vienne and put down St. Zachary, St. Martin and St. Verus, later successors of Crescens, as belonging to the Apostolic period. This legend was confirmed by the Recueil des privilèges de l'Eglise de Viene, which, however, was not compiled under the supervision of the future Pope Callistus II, as M. Gundlach maintained, but a little earlier, about 1060, as Louis Duchesne proved. This collection contains the pretended letters of a series of popes, from Pius I to Paschal II, and sustains the claims of the Church of Vienne. Le Livre épiscopal de l'archevêque Léger (1030–1070) included both the inventions of Ado and the forged letters of the Recueil.

It is historically certain that Verus, present at the Council of Arles (314), was the fourth Bishop of Vienne. In the beginning the twelve cities of the two Roman Vienne provinces were under the ecclesiastical jurisdiction of the Archbishop of Vienne, but when Arles was made an archbishopric, at the end of the fourth century, the see of Vienne grew less important. The disputes that later arose between it and the metropolitan of Arles concerning their respective antiquity are well known in ecclesiastical history.

In 450 Pope Leo I gave the Archbishop of Vienne the right to ordain the Bishops of Tarantaise, Valence, Geneva and Grenoble. Many vicissitudes followed, and the territorial limit of the powers of Metropolitan of Vienne followed the wavering frontier of the Kingdom of Burgundy and in 779, was considerably restricted by the organization of a new ecclesiastical province comprising Tarantaise, Aosta (in Italy) and Sitten (or Sion in French; in Switzerland).

In 1120 Calixtus II, who had been Bishop of Vienne, decided that the Archbishop of Vienne should have for suffragans the Bishop of Grenoble, Bishop of Valence, Bishop of Die, Bishop of Viviers, Bishop of Geneva, and Bishop of Maurienne; that the Archbishop of Tarantaise should obey him, notwithstanding the fact that this archbishop himself had suffragans, that he should exercise the primacy over the province of Bourges, province of Narbonne, province of Bordeaux, province of Aix, province of Auch and province of Embrun, and that, as the metropolitans of both provinces already bore the title of primate, the Archbishop of Vienne should be known as the "Primate of Primates".

In 1023 the Archbishops of Vienne became secular lords paramount. They had the title of Count, making them prince-archbishops, and when in 1033 the Kingdom of Burgundy-Arles was reunited to the Holy Roman Empire, they retained their independence. They obtained from the empire the title of Archchancellors of the Kingdom of Arles (1157).

Besides the four Bishops of Vienne heretofore mentioned, others are honoured as saints. According to the chronology created by M. Duchesne, they are: St. Justus, St. Dionysius, St. Paracodes, St. Florentius (about 374), St. Lupicinus, St. Simplicius (about 400), St. Paschasius, St. Nectarius, St. Nicetas (about 449), St. Mamertus (died 475 or 476), who instituted the rogation days, whose brother Claudianus Mamertus was known as a theologian and poet, and during whose episcopate St. Leonianus held for forty years the post of grand penitentiary at Vienne; St. Avitus (494 – 5 February, 518), St. Julianus (about 520–533), Pantagathus (about 538), Namatius (died 559), St. Evantius (died 584–586), St. Verus (586), St. Desiderius (Didier) 596–611, St. Domnolus (about 614), St. Ætherius, St. Hecdicus, St. Chaoaldus (about 654–664), St. Bobolinus, St. Georgius, St. Deodatus, St. Blidrannus (about 680), St. Eoldus, St. Eobolinus, St. Barnardus (810–841), noted for his conspiracies in favour of the sons of Louis the Pious, St. Ado (860–875), author of a universal history and two martyrologies, St. Thibaud (end of the tenth century).

Among its later bishops were Guy of Burgundy (1084–1119), who became Pope Callixtus II; Christophe de Beaumont, who occupied the see of Vienne for seven months of the year 1745 and afterwards became Archbishop of Paris; Jean Georges Le Franc de Pompignan (1774–1790), brother of the poet and a great enemy of the "philosophers", and also d'Aviau (1790–1801), illustrious because of his strong opposition to the civil constitution of the clergy and the first of the émigré bishops to re-enter France (May, 1797), returning under an assumed name and at the peril of his life.

Michael Servetus was living in Vienne, whither he had been attracted by Archbishop Pierre Palmier, when Calvin denounced him to the Inquisition for his books. During the proceedings ordered by ecclesiastical authority of Vienne, Servetus fled to Switzerland (1553).

In 1605 the Jesuits founded a college at Vienne, and here Massillon taught at the close of the 17th century. The churches of Saint-Pierre and Saint-André le Haut are ancient Benedictine foundations. The famous council of Vienne was held at Vienne in 1311 (see also Templars).

After the Napoleonic Concordat of 1801, the archiepiscopal title of Vienne passed to the see of Lyon, whose Metropolitan was henceforth called "Archbishop of Lyons and Vienne", although Vienne belongs to the Diocese of Grenoble.

Ordinaries

Bishops

 Castulus legendary celebrated with a feast day since the 13th century celebrated on October 14 (ms CP 601)
Zacharias (died 106)
Crescentius (c. 160)
Martin
 Verus 
Justus
Denis (Dionysius) 
Paracodes (c. 235) 
Paschasius (died 310/12)
Verus I (c. 314)
Nectarius (c. 356) 
Florentius I (c. 372) 
Lupicinus
Simplicius (c. 400–420) 
Jerome (Hieronymus) (c. 421)
Claudius (c. 440)
Nicetius (c. 449)
Florentius II
Mamertus (died 475/76)
Hesychius I (c. 475–490)
Avitus (494–518)
Julian (c. 520–530)
Domninus (died 536)
Pantagathus (c. 538)
Hesychius II (c. 545–565)
Namatius (died 559)
Philip (c. 567–580)
Evantius (c. 580–586)
Verus II (586–c.590)
Desiderius (c. 590–607)
Domnolus (c. 614–620)
Etherius
Clarentius fl. 624
Sindulf (Syndulph)
Landalenus (c. 625–650)
Edictus
Caldeoldus(654 — 664)
Bobolinus I (Dodolin)
Deodatus
Blidramnus (c. 675–680)
Agratus (Agroecius) (fl. 691)
George (c. 699)
Eoaldus or Edaldus (c. 700–715)
Bobolinus II (fl. 718)
Austrebert (719–742)

Archbishops

Wilichar (742–752)
Proculus
Bertericus (767–790)
Ursio (c. 790–796)
Wulfar (797–810)
Bernard (810–842)
Agilmar (841–859)
Ado (859–875)
Otramnus (878–885)
Bernoinus (886–899)
Raginfred (899–907)
Alexander I (908–926)
Sobon (927–c. 950)
Theobald (957–1001)
Blessed Burchard  c. 1010–c. 1030
Léger  1030–1070
Armand  1070–1076
Warmond  1077–1081
Gontard  1082–1084
Guido of Burgundy 1088–1119
Peter I  1121–1125
Stephen I  c. 1125–c. 1145
Humbert I 1146–1147
Hugo  c. 1148–1153
Stephen II  c. 1155–1163
Guillaume de Clermont 1163–1166?
Robert de La Tour du Pin  c. 1170–1195
Aynard de Moirans 1195–c. 1205
Humbert II 1206–1215
Bournon  1216–1218
Jean de Bernin  1218–1266
Guy d'Auvergne de Clermont  c. 1268–1278 (House of Auvergne)
Guillaume de Livron (or de Valence)  1283–c. 1305
Briand de Lavieu (Lagnieu)  1306–1317
Simon d'Archiac 1319–1320,  Cardinal
Guillaume de Laudun 1321–1327 (then Archbishop of Toulouse)
Bertrand de La Chapelle  1327–1352
Pierre Bertrand  1352–1362
Pierre de Gratia  1362–1363 (also Archbishop of Naples)
Louis de Villars  1363–1377
Humbert de Montchal  1377–1395
Thibaud de Rougemont  1395–1405 (also Archbishop of Besançon)
Jean de Nant 1405–1423 (also Bishop of Paris)
Jean de Norry 1423–1438 (also Archbishop of Besançon)
Geoffroy Vassal  1440–1444 (then Archbishop of Lyon)
Jean Gérard de Poitiers  1448–c. 1452 (also Bishop of Valence)
Jean du Chastel  1452–1453 (also Bishop of Nîmes)
Antoine de Poisieu (Poisieux) 1453–1473, died 1495
Guy de Poisieu (Poisieux)  1473–1480
Astorge Aimery 1480–1482
Ângelo Catho de Supino  1482–1495
Antoine de Clermont 1496–1506, died 1509
Frédéric de Saint-Severin  1506–1515, Cardinal
Alexandre de Saint-Severin 1515–1527
 Scaramuccia Trivulzio March to August 1527
Pierre Palmier (Paumier) 1528–1554
Charles de Marillac 1557–1560 (also Bishop of Vannes)
Jean de La Brosse 1561–1567 oder 1569
Vespasien Gribaldi  1569–1575
Pierre de Villars I 1576–1587
Pierre de Villars II  1587–1598
Jérôme de Villars  1598–1626
Pierre de Villars III  1626–1662
Henri de Villars  1662–1693
Armand de Montmorin de Saint-Hérem 1694–1713
François de Bertons de Crillon 1714–1720
Henri Oswald de La Tour D'Auvergne  1721–1745
Christophe de Beaumont du Repaire  1745–1746 (also Archbishop of Paris)
Jean d'Yse de Saléon 1747–1751 (also Bishop of Rodez)
Guillaume d'Hugues 1751–1774
Jacques de Condorcet ? 1754–
Jean Georges Lefranc de Pompignan  1774–1789
Charles François d'Aviau du Bois-de-Sanzay  1790–1801

See also
Catholic Church in France
Council of Vienne
List of Catholic dioceses in France
Philippe du Contant de la Molette
Severus of Vienne

References

Bibliography

Reference Sources
 pp. 548–549. (Use with caution; obsolete)
  p. 301. (in Latin)
 p. 175.

 p. 219.

Studies

  p. 527. (in Latin)

 
 
Vienne
1801 disestablishments in France